Chiloglanis niloticus is a species of upside-down catfish native to the Nile River and Niger River.  This species grows to a length of  SL.

References

External links 

niloticus
Fish of Egypt
Fish of Ethiopia
Freshwater fish of West Africa
Fish of Sudan
Taxa named by George Albert Boulenger
Fish described in 1900